Cyprus first competed at the  Deaflympics way back in 1997. Since then Cyprus has been participating at the Deaflympics regularly. Cyprus won its first Deaflympic medal for bowling at the  2013 Summer Deaflympics. Cyprus has never participated in the Winter Deaflympics.

Medal tallies

Summer Deaflympics

Medals at each sports events

See also 
Cyprus at the Paralympics
Cyprus at the Olympics

References

External links 
 2017 Deaflympics

Nations at the Deaflympics
Parasports in Cyprus